Maria Celeste Rebordão Rodrigues ComIH (14 March 1923 – 1 August 2018) was a Portuguese fadista (fado singer) and the younger sister of Amália Rodrigues.

Biography
Celeste Rodrigues was born in Fundão in the district of Castelo Branco in Portugal on the 14th of March, 1923. Her family moved to Lisbon when she was five years old. She started work in a cake factory, and subsequently she and her sister Amalia worked in a shop that sold regional produce. Soon discovered by the impresario José Miguel, who heard her sing and insisted she turn professional. By the age of 22 she was appearing regularly at the Casablanca (now the Teatro ABC). At 25, she met the actor Varela Silva whom she later married; they had two daughters. 

After Carnation Revolution in 1974, Rodrigues went to Canada for six months, where her only marriage to actor Varela Silva ended in divorce; then she moved to the United States. She commuted for many years between her two residences in Lisbon and Washington, D.C., where her two daughters live.

Although she did not achieve nearly as comprehensive a career as her sister, Rodrigues was able to achieve substantial fame in her own right (especially in Portugal itself) with recordings such as Lenda das Algas (Legend of the Seaweed), Já é tarde (It is already late) and the emblematic Fado Celeste achievements. 

Rodrigues sang a traditional style of fado, as opposed to the modern style of fado that her sister sang. In 2018, she was the oldest fado singer in the world, continuing to sing at age 95. 

Rodrigues died on 1 August 2018, in Lisbon and she was buried in the Artists' Field at Prazeres Cemetery.

Discography
 2007 Fado Celeste (CD, CoastCompany)

Compilations
 1995 O Melhor dos Melhores n.º 55 (CD, Movieplay)

References

External links 
 

1923 births
2018 deaths
20th-century Portuguese women singers
21st-century Portuguese women singers
Portuguese fado singers
Commanders of the Order of Prince Henry
People from Fundão, Portugal